In geometry, a cuboctahedral prism is a convex uniform 4-polytope. This 4-polytope has 16 polyhedral cells: 2 cuboctahedra connected by 8 triangular prisms and 6 cubes.

It is one of 18 uniform polyhedral prisms created by using uniform prisms to connect pairs of parallel Platonic solids and Archimedean solids.

Alternative names
Cuboctahedral dyadic prism
Rhombioctahedral prism 
Rhombioctahedral hyperprism

External links 
 
 

4-polytopes